Southease railway station is located  east of the village of Southease in East Sussex, England. It is on the Seaford branch of the East Coastway Line,  measured from  via Redhill. The station is surrounded by agricultural land. The South Downs Way crosses the Seaford Branch here.

History
The station was renamed Southease on 12 May 1980.

There was a racecourse between the railway line and the River Ouse from the late 1920s to the early 1940s.

Infrastructure
The station is unmanned and has two platforms, each with a PERTIS machine. A self-service ticket machine was also installed in 2016. There is a level crossing immediately north of the station leading to Itford Farm and the A26 road. The crossing is a user-controlled crossing with barriers which can be raised or lowered by road users. There is a pedestrian gate for walkers and cyclists. There is also a footbridge over the line.

Services
Services from the station are provided by Southern.

 the typical off-peak service is:
1 train per hour to 
1 train per hour to Seaford

Gallery

References

External links

Station Layout
Southease village website
TQ4305 : Southease Station Occupational Crossing at geograph.org.uk

Lewes District
Railway stations in East Sussex
DfT Category F2 stations
Former London, Brighton and South Coast Railway stations
Railway stations in Great Britain opened in 1906
Railway stations served by Govia Thameslink Railway